Moon Ki-han (born March 17, 1989) is a South Korean footballer who currently plays as midfielder for Dangjin Citizen FC.

Club career statistics 
Statistics accurate as of 25 December 2016

References

External links
 
 Moon Ki-han – National Team stats at KFA 

1989 births
Living people
Association football midfielders
South Korean footballers
FC Seoul players
Ansan Mugunghwa FC players
Daegu FC players
Bucheon FC 1995 players
K League 1 players
K League 2 players
Sportspeople from Busan
South Korea under-20 international footballers
South Korea under-23 international footballers